"Forever Love" is a song recorded by South Korean girl group Fin.K.L for their second studio album, White (1999). It was written by Kim Young-ah, while production and arrangement was handled by Joo Tae-young and Jo Seong-jin. It was made available as part of White on May 13, 1999, serving as the primary single from the album. 

Upon its release, "Forever Love" was met widespread recognition in South Korea and won the group various accolades at year-end award ceremonies, including the Grand Prize at the annual SBS Gayo Daejeon and Seoul Music Awards.

Background and promotion 
"Eternal Love" serves as one of the singles off of Fin.K.L's second Korean studio album White, which was released through DSP Media, then known as Daesung Entertainment, on May 13, 1999. The group subsequently began promotions on weekly music programs, where they received their first music show win on Music Bank on May 25. It topped Music Bank for two weeks in a row in addition to three consecutive weeks on Inkigayo.

Reception and impact 
In 2014, South Korean music webzine Music Taste Y including the song in their list of 120 Best Dance Songs of All Time, where the publication highlighted the innocent 'girl image' conveyed in the track, with the member's pure and soft image attracting the attention of boys around the country. In a 2016 survey conducted by The Dong-a Ilbo involving 2,000 people, "Forever Love" was voted the sixth best female idol song released in the past 20 years; Fin.K.L additionally ranked second in the vote for favorite female artists in the survey. In Melon and newspaper Seoul Shinmuns collaborative "100 K-pop Masterpieces" list involving 35 music experts, the song was ranked at number 57. Music critic and Kakao M director Kwon Seok-jeong said that with "Forever Love", Fin.K.L established the "fairy" concept among K-pop girl groups, noting that the song, costumes, and choreography constituted "the perfect trinity". Kwon added that the "fairy" image became the most widely imitated concept among junior girl groups over the next decade before the rise in popularity of "girl crush".

Awards

References

External links
 

1999 songs
K-pop songs